During World War II, the United States Army Air Forces (USAAF) took control of Hillsgrove State Airport (now T.F. Green Airport) in Warwick, Rhode Island for training pilots and aircrews of USAAF fighters and bombers.

The one airfield was under the command of First Air Force or the Army Air Forces Training Command (AAFTC) (A predecessor of the current-day United States Air Force Air Education and Training Command). However the other USAAF support commands (Air Technical Service Command (ATSC); Air Transport Command (ATC) or Troop Carrier Command) in other states commanded a significant number of airfields in a support roles.

At the end of the war, the airfield was returned to service as a state airport, instead of being retained as a United States Air Force installation that could have been a front-line base during the Cold War. There is the possibility that a few of the temporary buildings that were used survive today, and are being used for other purposes.

Major Airfields 
First Air Force
 Hillsgrove/Providence AAF, Providence
 435th Army Air Force Base Unit
Now : T. F. Green Airport

References
 Maurer, Maurer (1983). Air Force Combat Units Of World War II. Maxwell AFB, Alabama: Office of Air Force History. .
 Ravenstein, Charles A. (1984). Air Force Combat Wings Lineage and Honors Histories 1947-1977. Maxwell AFB, Alabama: Office of Air Force History. .
 Thole, Lou (1999), Forgotten Fields of America : World War II Bases and Training, Then and Now - Vol. 2.  Pictorial Histories Pub . 
 Military Airfields in World War II - Rhode Island

External links

 01
World War II
Airfields of the United States Army Air Forces in the United States by state
United States World War II army airfields